The 1884 Kentucky Derby was the 10th running of the Kentucky Derby. The race took place on May 16, 1884.

Full results

Payout

The winner received a purse of $3,990.
Second place received $200.

References

1884
Kentucky Derby
May 1884 sports events
Derby